SmartFTP is a network file transfer program for Microsoft Windows that supports file transfer via FTP, FTPS, SFTP, WebDAV, Amazon S3, Google Drive, Microsoft OneDrive, Box, Google Cloud Storage and Backblaze B2 protocols. It supports SSL/TLS, IPv6 and FXP, and features a transfer queue, proxy and firewall support, multiple connections, chmod features and drag-and-drop. The software uses the Windows API for its interface. It is available for both IA-32 and x64 editions of Windows.

Prior to July 2008, the program was free to home or non-profit users.

Editions
SmartFTP is available in three editions:

Professional 
 FTP, FTPS
 SFTP over SSH
 WebDAV
 Text Editor

Ultimate 
 All features of the Professional Edition 
 Google Drive
 OneDrive support
 Terminal client

Enterprise 
 All features of the Ultimate Edition
 Amazon S3
 Google Cloud Storage
 Backblaze B2
 Box
 Task scheduler

See also
Comparison of FTP client software

References

External links
Official website
SmartFTP UI discussed in "The semiotic engineering of human-computer interaction, Clarisse Sieckenius De Souza, MIT Press"
Introduction to SmartFTP 4.0 with Texteditor and Terminal (German)

FTP clients
Windows Internet software
Windows-only shareware